A Northern Ireland Assembly election has to be held to elect 90 members to the Northern Ireland Assembly if the parties fail to form an Executive, which they have yet to do so. After the Northern Ireland Assembly election on 5 May 2022, the DUP declined to agree on the appointment of Speaker to the Assembly, preventing the formation of an Executive. Chris Heaton-Harris, the Secretary of State for Northern Ireland, confirmed a legal obligation to call an election if no Executive was formed by a 27 October 2022 deadline. No Executive was formed by this deadline, but the deadline was extended by legislation in the Westminster Parliament. A deadline of 18 January 2024 is now proposed.

The next election will be the eighth since the assembly was established in 1998. Seven parties have MLAs in the seventh assembly: Sinn Féin led by Michelle O'Neill, the Democratic Unionist Party (DUP) led by Jeffrey Donaldson, Alliance led by Naomi Long, the Ulster Unionist Party (UUP) led by Doug Beattie, the Social Democratic and Labour Party (SDLP) led by Colum Eastwood, Traditional Unionist Voice (TUV) led by Jim Allister, and People Before Profit (PBP), who have a collective leadership.

Background 
Section 7 of the Northern Ireland (Miscellaneous Provisions) Act 2014 specifies that elections will be held on the first Thursday in May on the fifth calendar year following that in which its predecessor was elected, which would be 6 May 2027. However, there are several circumstances in which the Assembly can be dissolved before the date scheduled by virtue of section 31(1) of the Northern Ireland Act 1998.

After the 2022 Northern Ireland Assembly election, the DUP declined to join in forming a government due to its opposition to the Northern Ireland Protocol on post-Brexit trading arrangements. If no government is formed within six months, the United Kingdom Government's Northern Ireland Secretary can call a new election early.

On 28 September 2022, Chris Heaton-Harris, the Secretary of State for Northern Ireland, stated that he had a legal obligation to call an early election on 28 October if no government was formed by that date, probably to be held no later than January 2023. Sinn Féin leader Michelle O'Neill voiced her opposition to such an election: "The people spoke, and the people asked for a functioning executive, they asked for us to make politics work." Both the UK Prime Minister Rishi Sunak and the Irish Tánaiste (Deputy Prime Minister) Leo Varadkar had urged the DUP to agree to the formation of a Government.

The parties met on 27 October and failed to elect a Speaker, the fourth time they had met and failed to do so, and no government was formed by the deadline. On 28 October, Heaton-Harris expressed disappointment that no Executive had been formed and acknowledged his legal duty to call an election, but delayed immediately calling one. The chief electoral officer said the election date would likely be 15 December. The last date that an election could be held under the legislation existing then was 19 January 2023.

On 29 October, Heaton-Harris continued to delay calling an election. Claire Hanna, a Member of Parliament for the SDLP, reacted to the news, saying an election was now "less likely". Heaton-Harris held another round of talks with the political parties on 1 November, amid speculation that the UK government could introduce legislation to delay the need for a new election. However, Northern Ireland Office Minister Steve Baker said on 2 November that Heaton-Harris "will soon confirm the date of the next Northern Ireland Assembly election as required by law."

Legal extensions to the deadline to form an Executive
On 4 November, Heaton-Harris said an election would not be held in December. On 9 November, he said that he would be introducing legislation to extend the deadline to form a new Assembly Executive to 8 December 2022, with the option for an additional 6-week extension. The requisite legislation was passed by the Westminster Parliament on 6 December 2022.

The December 2022 deadline passed without any resolution. The deadline was extended to 19 January 2023. Heaton-Harris invited the parties to new talks on 11 January 2023 to discuss the situation, but Sinn Féin pulled out in protest at the exclusion of its President, Mary Lou McDonald, after which the SDLP refused to take part as well.

Under the then legislation, the latest possible date for the next election, if an Executive is not formed, was 13 April 2023. The deadline to form an Executive passed on 19 January 2023, but Heaton-Harris played down the prospect of him calling a snap election.

Under existing legislation, Heaton-Harris will have to call an election by the end of the first week of March 2023. However, he has proposed a further extension, with a new deadline to form an Executive of 18 January 2024 proposed. This was achieved through the Northern Ireland (Executive Formation) Bill 2022–23, which completed its passage through the Westminster Parliament in late February 2023.

On 27 February 2023, the UK and EU announced the Windsor Framework to make changes to the Northern Ireland protocol. It was hoped that this would lead to formation of an Assembly executive.

Opinion polling 

Note: Next to the party initials at the top of the table there are the letters "N", "O", and "U". These show how the parties have chosen to designate themselves, Unionist (U), Nationalist (N) or other (O), in the Assembly previously (or, in the case of Aontú, how they are expected to designate if they win a seat). This is a function of the Assembly's consociational design.

Footnotes

References 

Elections to the Northern Ireland Assembly
Northern Ireland